Timeless is the sixth studio album by American singer Kenny Lattimore. It was released by Verve Records on September 9, 2008 in the United States. His first album solo album since 2001's Weekend, it followed Lattimore's duet albums with his wife Chanté Moore, Things That Lovers Do (2003) and Uncovered/Covered (2006).

Critical reception 

AllMusic editor Andy Kellman gave Timeless a three out of five stars rating. He found that the album "is another set lacking in fresh material must be a point of soreness for the singer's fans, but, taken on its own, the disc is hardly worth disregarding."

Track listing

Personnel 

 Kenny Lattimore –  vocals
 Sherrod Barnes –  guitar, wah-wah guitar
 Ira Siegel –  guitar, sitar
 John Smith –  acoustic guitar
 Mark Gross –  alto saxophone
 Keith Loftis, Everette Harp –  tenor saxophone
 Jason Marshall –  baritone saxophone
 George Fontenette –  trumpet, programming, drum programming
 Saunders Sermons –  trombone

 Barry Eastmond –  Fender Rhodes piano, keyboards
 Chedrick Mitchell –  organ
 John Anderson –  synthesizer
 Dustin Moore, Jerry Barnes –  bass guitar
 Michael White, Omar Hakim, Ralph Rolle, Wilburn "Squidley" Cole –  drums
 Gordon Williams –  percussion, programming
 Rafael Padilla, Bashiri Johnson –  percussion
 Amanda Dandy, Tabetha Dandy, Tamika Peoples, Eddie Cole –  background vocals
 Gordon Williams; Ray Bardani –  mixing

Charts

References

External links 
 

2008 albums
Kenny Lattimore albums
Covers albums